U.S. Bicycle Route 7 (USBR 7) is a north–south U.S. Bicycle Route that follows the Western New England Greenway in Connecticut, Massachusetts, and Vermont in the United States.

Route description
USBR 7 runs parallel to U.S. Route 7 from a junction with the East Coast Greenway in Norwalk, Connecticut, to Route Verte 4 at the Canadian border. The Vermont segment was established in 2015, and the rest of the route was added the following year. When U.S. Bicycle Route 1 is extended through Connecticut, it is expected to meet USBR 7 near Norwalk.

References

External links

 Western New England Greenway

07
Bike paths in Connecticut
Bike paths in Massachusetts
Bike paths in Vermont
2015 establishments in Vermont
2016 establishments in Connecticut
2016 establishments in Massachusetts